The Azad Jammu & Kashmir Bar Council, also known as AJK Bar Council, is a statutory & deliberative assembly of lawyers in Azad Kashmir for safeguarding the rights, interests and privileges of practicing lawyers, within Azad Kashmir. 

Fiyaz Haider Nawabi Advocate is the current vice-chairman of the Council.

See also
 List of Pakistani Lawyers
 Pakistan Bar Council
 Punjab Bar Council
 Sindh Bar Council
 Khyber Pakhtunkhwa Bar Council

References

External links
 

Bar Councils in Pakistan
Organisations based in Azad Kashmir